Rana holtzi, also known as the Taurus frog, is a frog species of the Ranidae family endemic to Turkey, varying in size from 6.0 to 7.5cm. It is the only extant frog species that doesn't croak. Although it was only thought to be present in Karagöl and Çiniligöl, research conducted in 2007 revealed Eğrigöl as another habitat where the species is present.

References

External links 
Mehmet Zülfü Yıldız & Bayram Göçmen (2012), Population dynamics, reproduction, and life history traits of Taurus Frog, Rana holtzi Werner, 1898 (Anura: Ranidae) in Karagöl (Ulukışla, Niğde), Turkey, Herpetologica Romanica, Vol. 6, 2012, pp. 1–40
TÜBİTAK Toros kurbağası from Turkey Taxonomic Species Database
 "Toros kurbağası sayısında artış" news article from Kentselhaber.com.

holtzi
Endemic fauna of Turkey